The 1922 Marquette Hilltoppers football team was an American football team that represented Marquette University as an independent during the 1922 college football season. In its first season under head coach Frank Murray, the team compiled an 8–0–1 record, shut out eight of its nine opponents, and outscored all opponents by a total of 213 to 3.

Schedule

References

Marquette
Marquette Golden Avalanche football seasons
College football undefeated seasons
Marquette Hilltoppers football